Murray Lew Weidenbaum (February 10, 1927 – March 20, 2014), was an American economist and author. He was the Edward Mallinckrodt Distinguished University Professor and Honorary Chairman of the Murray Weidenbaum Center on the Economy, Government, and Public Policy at Washington University in St. Louis. He served as the first Assistant Secretary of the Treasury for Economic Policy from 1969 to 1971, and he was chairman of President Ronald Reagan's first Council of Economic Advisors from 1981 to 1982.

Biography
Weidenbaum was born to a Jewish family in the Bronx. He received a BBA from City College of New York, an M.A. from Columbia University, and a Ph.D. from Princeton University with thesis titled Government Spending: Process and Measurement. He became a faculty member at Washington University in St. Louis in 1964 and was chair of the economics department from 1966 to 1969. In 1975 he helped found the Center for the Study of American Business at Washington University, which was later renamed the Weidenbaum Center in his honor.

Weidenbaum did extensive research on the role of the Overseas Chinese bamboo network in Southeast Asia. He explores the topic in his book The Bamboo Network: How Expatriate Chinese Entrepreneurs are Creating a New Economic Superpower in Asia.

Weidenbaum died on March 29, 2014, at his home in Clayton, Missouri, at 87.

References

External links
 Murray Weidenbaum biography via Washington University in St. Louis
 
 http://www.oac.cdlib.org/data/13030/5j/kt1000345j/files/kt1000345j.pdf
 http://news.wustl.edu/news/Pages/26682.aspx
 

|-

1927 births
2014 deaths
Economists from New York (state)
Bamboo network
City College of New York alumni
Columbia University alumni
Jewish American writers
Princeton University alumni
United States Assistant Secretaries of the Treasury
Washington University in St. Louis faculty
Writers from New York City
Chairs of the United States Council of Economic Advisers